David Barrufet Bofill (born 4 June 1970 in Barcelona, Spain) is a former Spanish handball goalkeeper, who last played for FC Barcelona Handbol during the 2009-10 season.

He began playing handball in SAFA Horta school in Barcelona at 8 years old. Six years later he went to F.C. Barcelona for playing in younger categories till 1988, when he played with the professional team.

In 2000-2001 and 2001-2002 seasons was elected by International Handball Federation as the best goalkeeper in the world.

On 8 February 2010, Barrufet announced his retirement from handball at the end of the 2009-10 season and F.C. Barcelona decided to retire the shirt number 16 on his honor.

Trophies
 7 European Cups (1990–1991, 1995–1996, 1996–1997, 1997–1998, 1998–1999, 1999–2000 and 2004–2005)
 2 European Cup Winners' Cups (1993–1994 and 1994–1995)
 1 EHF Cup (2002–2003)
 5 European Super Cups (1996–1997, 1997–1998, 1998–1999, 1999–2000 and 2003–2004)
 11 Liga ASOBAL (1988–1989, 1989–1990, 1990–1991, 1991–1992, 1995–1996, 1996–1997, 1997–1998, 1998–1999, 1999–2000, 2002–2003 and 2005–2006)
 8 King's Cups (1989–1990, 1992–1993, 1993–1994, 1996–1997, 1997–1998, 1999–2000, 2003–2004 and 2006–2007)
 11 Spanish Supercups (1988–1989, 1989–1990, 1990–1991, 1991–1992, 1993–1994, 1996–1997, 1997–1998, 1999–2000, 2000–2001, 2003–2004 and 2006–2007)
 6 ASOBAL Cups (1994–1995, 1995–1996, 1999–2000, 2000–2001,2001–2002 and 2009–2010)
 8 Pirenees Leagues (1997–1998, 1998–1999, 1999–2000, 2000–2001, 2001–2002, 2003–2004, 2005–2006 and 2006–2007)
 6 Catalan leagues (1990–1991, 1991–1992, 1992–1993, 1993–1994, 1994–1995 and 1996–1997)
 World Championship (Tunisia 2005)
 Bronze medal in the Olympic Games (Sydney 2000)
 Bronze medal in the Olympic Games (Beijing 2008)
 Silver medal in the European Championship (Spain 1996)
 Silver medal in the European Championship (Italy 1998)
 Silver medal in the European Championship (Switzerland 2006)
 Bronze medal in the European Championship (Croatia 2000).

External links

F.C. Barcelona website 
Barrufet anuncia su retiro 

1970 births
Living people
Spanish male handball players
Handball players from Catalonia
Liga ASOBAL players
FC Barcelona Handbol players
Handball players at the 1992 Summer Olympics
Handball players at the 2000 Summer Olympics
Handball players at the 2004 Summer Olympics
Handball players at the 2008 Summer Olympics
Olympic handball players of Spain
Olympic bronze medalists for Spain
Sportspeople from Barcelona
Olympic medalists in handball
Medalists at the 2008 Summer Olympics
Medalists at the 2000 Summer Olympics
Mediterranean Games gold medalists for Spain
Competitors at the 2005 Mediterranean Games
Mediterranean Games medalists in handball